Sir John Clere (1511? – 21 August 1557) was an English politician and naval commander.

Career
He was eldest surviving son of Sir Robert Clere of Ormsby, Norfolk, and his second wife Alice, daughter of Sir William Boleyn, of Blickling Hall, Norfolk. He succeeded to his father's estates in 1529 and in 1538 came into possession of about 20 manors, mostly on the Norfolk coast, following his mother's death.

He married, by 1531, Anne, daughter of Sir Thomas Tyrrell of Gipping, Suffolk, with whom he had three sons and two daughters. Clere was knighted in 1539. He was a Member of Parliament (MP) for Bramber 1542 and 1545, Thetford March 1553 and Norfolk 1555.

His third and first surviving son, Edward Clere, also became an MP and led an illustrious career.

Naval service
He served in the Royal Navy as captain of the ships Peter Longanarde or Peter Pomegranate (1545) and Swepestake (1546).  He served in France as treasurer of the English army stationed there from November 1549 to April 1550.  In 1556 he was appointed Vice-Admiral at Portsmouth.  His first mission was to escort the abdicated Emperor Charles V to retirement in Spain, receiving a golden chain from him.

Defeat at Kirkwall
His second assignment was to command with Admiral William Woodhouse a naval expedition against Scotland.

Clere's fleet in July included; the Minion, the Trinity Henry, the Salamander, the Mary Willoughby, the Greyhound, the Bull, the Tiger, the New Bark, and the Flower de Luce.

He was drowned in August 1557 in battle with a Scots fleet in the Orkney Islands. According to the report of John Southerne, captain of the Gabriel, Clere burnt Kirkwall town on 11 August and on next day entered the Cathedral and brought six cannon on shore to batter the castle. On Friday 13 the force on shore attempting to take the Bishop's Palace was beaten back to sea by 3000 islanders, and 97 men including Clere were drowned.

References

1511 births
1557 deaths
16th-century Royal Navy personnel
English admirals
English knights
English MPs 1542–1544
English MPs 1545–1547
English MPs 1553 (Edward VI)
English MPs 1555
Military personnel from London
Politicians from Norwich
People from the Borough of Great Yarmouth
Members of the Parliament of England for Norfolk
Military personnel from Norwich